Fazilka was a Lok Sabha constituency in Punjab from 1967 to 1977. It was the successor of Fazilka-Sirsa constituency which existed from 1952 to 1957. Post the 1976 delimitation, parts of it came under Firozpur Lok Sabha constituency.

Members of Parliament
As Fazilka-Sirsa Lok Sabha constituency

As Fazilka Lok Sabha constituency

^bypoll

For post-1977 results, see Firozpur Lok Sabha constituency

See also
 Fazilka
 List of Constituencies of the Lok Sabha
 Firozpur Lok Sabha constituency

References 

Former Lok Sabha constituencies of Punjab, India
1971 disestablishments in India
Former constituencies of the Lok Sabha